John Stephen Devine was a Scottish professional footballer who played in the Football League for Queens Park Rangers and in the Scottish League for Aberdeen as an inside right.

Honours 
Aberdeen

 Dewar Shield: 1935–36

Career statistics

References 

Clapton Orient F.C. wartime guest players
English Football League players
Year of death missing
Place of death missing
Year of birth missing
Scottish footballers
Association football inside forwards
Footballers from Glasgow
St Roch's F.C. players
Aberdeen F.C. players
Scottish Football League players
Queens Park Rangers F.C. players
Brighton & Hove Albion F.C. wartime guest players